Eastry Rural District was a rural district in the county of Kent, England, from 1894 to 1974. It was subject to a significant boundary reform in 1935 when several parishes were gained from the disbanded Isle of Thanet Rural District and other parishes were reorganised.

It included the following civil parishes:

References

Districts of England created by the Local Government Act 1894
History of Kent
Thanet
Rural districts of England
Districts of England abolished by the Local Government Act 1972